Yeovil Town Football Club, an association football club based in Yeovil, Somerset, was founded in 1895. They were elected to play in the Southern League for the 1922–23 season. After fifty-one seasons in the Southern League, they were elected to play in newly formed Football Conference in 1979.

Yeovil were promoted to the Football League Third Division in 2003, after 108 years in non-league football, and the 2004–05 season saw them promoted to the third tier of English football. Yeovil's first and only play-off success came in the 2012–13 season, when they beat Brentford 2–1 at Wembley Stadium to win promotion to the Championship, and the second tier for the first time.

Since their promotion to the Football League in 2003, Yeovil have spent 1 season in the second tier of English football, 9 seasons in the third tier and 6 seasons in the fourth tier. The table details Yeovil Town's achievements in senior first team competition from the 1895–96 season to the end of the most recently completed season.

Key

Key to league record:
P – Played
W – Games won
D – Games drawn
L – Games lost
F – Goals for
A – Goals against
Pts – Points
Pos – Final position

Key to colours and symbols:

Key to divisions:
Somerset – Somerset Senior League
Dorset – Dorset District League
Wiltshire – Wiltshire League
Western – Western League
Bristol – Bristol Charity League
Southern – Southern League
London – London Combination
Alliance – Alliance Premier League
Isthmian – Isthmian Premier League
Conference – Football Conference
Division 3 - Football League Third Division
League 2 - Football League Two
League 1 - Football League One
Championship - Football League Championship

Key to rounds:
GS – Group stage
QPR - Extra-prelimanary pre-qualifying
QR1 – First qualifying round, etc.
R1 – First round, etc.
R1 (S) – First round Southern section, etc.
QF (S) – Quarter-finals Southern section
SF – Semi-finals
SF (S) – Semi-finals Southern section
RU – Runners-up
W – Winners
DNE – Did not enter

Details of abandoned competitions are shown in italics and appropriately footnoted.

Seasons

Footnotes

References

Seasons
 
Yeovil Town